Tres mujeres en la hoguera (English: Three women in a bonfire) is a 1976 Mexican drama and thriller film.

Synopsis 
Rich Alex and his wife Mané invite a couple (Gloria and her lover Susy) to their house in the Pacific coast of Mexico (Puerto Vallarta) to spend a spring break there.

In a game of constant lust, the women tangle in a plot of eroticism, betrayal, ambition, passion and death.

Cast 
Maricruz Olivier — Gloria
Pilar Pellicer — Mané 
Maritza Olivares — Susy
Rogelio Guerra — Alex
Enrique Muñoz
Carlos Bravo y Fernández
Daniela Romo — Peggy

Notes

External links 
 

1976 films
1970s Spanish-language films
1970s thriller drama films
Mexican LGBT-related films
Films directed by Abel Salazar
Mexican thriller drama films
LGBT-related thriller drama films
1976 drama films
1976 LGBT-related films
1970s Mexican films